Telford is a borough in Bucks and Montgomery counties in the U.S. state of Pennsylvania. The population was 4,872 at the time of the 2010 census. Of this, 2,665 were in Montgomery County, and 2,207 were in Bucks County.

History

Founding
Originally inhabited by the Lenape people, the area surrounding Telford began to be settled in 1719 by Mennonites from the Palatinate of the Rhine.  In 1857, the town known as County Line (the area had previously been known as Hendrick's Blacksmith) changed its name to Telford after the North Pennsylvania Railroad Company (later absorbed into the Reading Railroad) named its new station there after civil engineer Thomas Telford.

Incorporation as a borough
The Borough of Telford was incorporated by decree of the Court of Quarter Sessions of Bucks County of November 10, 1886. A decade later, The Borough of West Telford was incorporated by decree of the Court of Quarter Sessions of Montgomery County of December 27, 1897. In 1934, the respective boroughs entered into an agreement for consolidation, and an election was held on this question on November 6, 1934. The voters of both boroughs approved the agreement, and on January 11, 1935, Governor Gifford Pinchot issued letters patent consolidating the two boroughs into the current Borough of Telford.

Geography
Telford is located at  (40.324786, -75.328045), elevation .

According to the United States Census Bureau, the borough has a total area of 1.0 square mile (2.6 km²), all land.

Transportation

No numbered highways serve Telford directly. Main thoroughfares traversing the town include Main Street and Church Road. State routes 309 and 563 are the closest state highways to Telford. 

A rail line that was formerly the Reading Company's Bethlehem Branch runs north-south through Telford connecting to Perkasie, Quakertown, and Bethlehem to the north and Souderton, Hatfield, and Lansdale to the south.  The line was used by the SEPTA Bethlehem Line until 1981. The tracks are still used for the transport of freight between Lansdale and Quakertown, and beyond. The line is used for occasional scenic rail trips, and resumption of passenger service to Quakertown is being considered. Telford is also the via point location for Pennsylvania Northeastern Railroad out of Lansdale and East Penn Railroad out of Quakertown. The Telford station is still standing, though remains vacant.

SEPTA Suburban Bus Route 132 starts in Telford and ends at the Montgomery Mall in Montgomeryville, serving Souderton, Hatfield, and Lansdale.

From 1901 to 1951, an interurban electric trolley line, Lehigh Valley Transit, known as the Liberty Bell Limited, ran from Telford north to Allentown (through Quakertown) and south (through Lansdale) to Philadelphia. During World War II, it carried a large number of passengers due to gas rationing, forcing a reduction in auto use, but after the war its business declined  and in 1951, it abandoned rail and converted to bus operation.

Demographics

As of the census of 2000,  4,681 people, 1,930 households, and 1,200 families resided in the borough. The population density was 4,618.2 people per square mile (1,789.1/km²). The 1,977 housing units averaged 1,950.9 per square mile (755.8/km²). The racial makeup of the borough was 92.48% White, 1.30% Black, 0.02% Native American, 3.76% Asian, 0.02% Pacific Islander, 1.13% from other races, and 1.28% from two or more races. Hispanics or Latinos of any race were 3.61% of the population.

Of the 1,930 households, 29.4% had children under the age of 18 living with them, 51.1% were married couples living together, 8.2% had a female householder with no husband present, and 37.8% were not families. About 33.3% of all households were made up of individuals, and 17.4% had someone living alone who was 65 years of age or older. The average household size was 2.34 and the average family size was 3.00.

In the borough, the population was distributed as 23.0% under the age of 18, 6.6% from 18 to 24, 33.2% from 25 to 44, 19.2% from 45 to 64, and 18.0% who were 65 years of age or older. The median age was 37 years. For every 100 females, there were 88.2 males. For every 100 females age 18 and over, there were 84.5 males.

The median income for a household in the borough was $45,451, and for a family was $56,809. Males had a median income of $38,750 versus $28,387 for females. The per capita income for the borough was $22,075. About 2.5% of families and 4.7% of the population were below the poverty line, including 4.3% of those under age 18 and 5.3% of those age 65 or over.

In 2008, the median household income was estimated at $58,350 (it was $45,451 in 2000).

In 2008, the estimated house or condo value was $256,582 (compared to $130,300 in 2000). In 2008, the per capita income was $28,979.

Politics and government

The borough is represented by the following officials:

U.S. House of Representatives 
 Brian Fitzpatrick (R), Pennsylvania's 1st congressional district

Pennsylvania State Senate 
 Steve Santarsiero (D), Pennsylvania Senate, District 10

Pennsylvania House of Representatives 
 Steve Malagari (D), Pennsylvania House of Representatives, District 53

Climate

According to the Köppen climate classification system, Telford has a Hot-summer, Humid continental climate (Dfa). Dfa climates are characterized by at least one month having an average mean temperature ≤ , at least four months with an average mean temperature ≥ , at least one month with an average mean temperature ≥  and no significant precipitation difference between seasons. Although most summer days are slightly humid in Telford, episodes of heat and high humidity can occur with heat index values > . The average wettest month is July, which corresponds with the annual peak in thunderstorm activity. Episodes of extreme cold and wind can occur, with wind chill values < . Ice storms and large snowstorms depositing ≥  of snow occur once every few years, particularly during nor’easters from December through February.

Ecology

According to the A. W. Kuchler U.S. potential natural vegetation types, Telford would have a dominant vegetation type of Appalachian Oak (104) with a dominant vegetation form of Eastern Hardwood Forest (25). The spring bloom typically begins by April 13 and fall color usually peaks by October 27.

Notable people
 Erik Kratz, former professional baseball catcher; was born in Telford in 1980.
 Alex McArthur, the lead actor in the "Desperado" TV series of films; was born in Telford in March 1957.

References

External links

 
 Souderton-Telford Main Streets

Populated places established in 1719
Boroughs in Montgomery County, Pennsylvania
Boroughs in Bucks County, Pennsylvania
Palatine German settlement in Pennsylvania
1886 establishments in Pennsylvania